Kip Tiernan (June 17, 1926 – July 2, 2011) was a social activist.

She was born Mary Jane Tiernan in Connecticut and raised by her grandmother, and came to Boston in her early 20s.

Kip Tiernan and her advocacy partner, Fran Froehlich, founded, helped found, or were founding members of Boston Health Care for the Homeless, Boston Food Bank, Community Works, Aid to Incarcerated Mothers, Finex House, Food for Free, John Leary House, My Sister’s Place, Transition House, the Greater Boston Union of the Homeless, and Boston’s Emergency Shelter Commission. In 1974, Kip founded Rosie's Place in Boston, America's first shelter for homeless women. She founded this shelter in an abandoned supermarket after discovering that homeless women disguised themselves as men in hopes of getting into male-only shelters. Kip was also one of the founders of Victory House in the South End of Boston, a residential alcoholism treatment program for homeless, alcoholic men.

In 1980, Kip and Fran Froehlich co-founded the Poor People's United Fund, and from 1988 to 1990 they were fellows at the Bunting Institute at Radcliffe College.

Kip's longtime companion, Edith Nicholson, died in the 1990s, and she married Donna Pomponio in 2004. Kip herself died July 2, 2011, of cancer.

References

External links
Papers of Kip Tiernan, 1944-2006. Schlesinger Library, Radcliffe Institute, Harvard University.

1926 births
2011 deaths
Deaths from cancer in Massachusetts
Homelessness activists
People from South End, Boston
21st-century American women